Islamic Jihad may refer to:

 Islamic Jihad Movement in Palestine
 Islamic Jihad Organization, former group that was active in Lebanon
 Islamic Jihad Union, active in Afghanistan and Pakistan
 Islamic Jihad of Yemen
 Turkish Islamic Jihad
 Egyptian Islamic Jihad

See also
Jihad, the Islamic theological concept